The Last Dance: Live is a two-part live album and DVD by UK band The Music and was released exclusively through Concert Live. It documents two concerts from their final tour, including their last gig which was released on DVD.

Track listing
Brixton Academy 04.08.2011
 The Dance
 Take the Long Road and Walk It
 The Truth is No Words
 Freedom Fighters
 Fire
 Human
 The Spike
 Welcome to the North
 Drugs
 Too High
 Strength in Numbers
 Getaway
 The People
 Bleed From Within
 The Walls Get Smaller

Leeds Academy 06.08.2011
 The Dance
 Take the Long Road and Walk It
 The Truth is No Words
 Freedom Fighters
 Fire
 Human
 The Spike
 Welcome to the North
 Drugs
 Too High
 Strength in Numbers
 Getaway
 The Walls Get Smaller
 Jag Tune
 Bleed From Within
 The People

References

2011 live albums
The Music (band) albums